Man Wo is a village in Sai Kung District, Hong Kong.

Administration
Man Wo is a recognized village under the New Territories Small House Policy.

History
Man Wo, together with its off-shoot Chuk Yuen,  was part of the inter-village grouping, the Ho Chung Tung or Ho Chung Seven Villages, which had its centre in Ho Chung.

References

External links
 Delineation of area of existing village Man Wo (Sai Kung) for election of resident representative (2019 to 2022) (includes Chuk Yuen)

Villages in Sai Kung District, Hong Kong